Philip Argyres is an American physicist and professor at the University of Cincinnati. He is an Elected Fellow of the American Physical Society and a member of Simons Foundation.

References

External links

Living people
University of Cincinnati faculty
Fellows of the American Physical Society
21st-century American physicists
Year of birth missing (living people)
Place of birth missing (living people)